Vizier Omer Pasha Vrioni (in Greek spelling: Ομέρ Βρυώνης, Omer Vryonis) was a leading Ottoman Albanian figure in the Greek War of Independence.

Early life
Omer Vrioni was a Muslim Tosk Albanian from the village of Vrioni near Berat (hence his surname), with a distinguished record in the battles in Egypt against Napoleon. When Ali Pasha revolted against the Sublime Porte, Omer was his treasurer. He initially commanded the army tasked with defending the eastern approaches to Ioannina, but entered into an agreement with Ismail Pasha, the then commander-in-chief of the Sultan's forces, disbanding his army in exchange for the pashalik of Berat.

After the death of Ali Pasha, Omer was among the commanders who were sent by Hurşid Ahmed Pasha, the new commander-in-chief, to suppress the Greek Revolution which had broken out in March 1821. On 24 April 1821, he defeated the Greeks at the Battle of Alamana and had their commander, Athanasios Diakos, impaled. Vrioni's advance was temporarily halted by Odysseas Androutsos who, with a handful of men, inflicted heavy casualties upon him at the Battle of the inn of Gravia on 8 May 1821.

Siege of Missolonghi

In late 1822, he and Mehmed Reshid Pasha joined forces to besiege the town of Missolonghi. The town was completely surrounded on 25 October, and might have fallen, had the locals left the city. However they resisted heroically and Vrioni resorted to negotiations in order to save his men, against the opinion of Mehmed Reshid and Yussuf Pasha. The besieged Greeks destroyed the morale of the Ottoman army and when they were reinforced by sea the novice Turkish captains and the two pashas scheduled their main assault for Christmas night, 24 December, calculating that the Greeks would be caught by surprise. However, the attack failed. Six days later, the siege was lifted.

Later career
As a result of this failure, the antagonism between Omer Vrioni and Mehmed Reshid escalated, resulting in his recall by the Porte in 1824, when he was assigned a command in Macedonia. During the later Russo-Turkish War of 1828, he led a 20,000 strong army in an unsuccessful attempt to relieve the siege of Varna.

References

Sources

 Brewer, David. The Greek War of Independence. The Overlook Press, 2001. 
 

People from Berat
Pashas
Ottoman military personnel of the Greek War of Independence
19th-century Albanian people
Albanians from the Ottoman Empire
Omer
Ali Pasha of Ioannina